Pet Sematary is the soundtrack album for the film of the same name. Produced by Elliot Goldenthal, it was released in 1989.

Background
Elliot Goldenthal's Pet Sematary record was his first mainstream film score.

Its style is sometimes compared to Jack Nitzsche's soundtrack for The Exorcist, while the theme is inspired by Lalo Schifrin's score to The Amityville Horror.

Track listing
 "The Pet Sematary" (3:00)
 "Dead Recollection" (1:19)
 "Hope and Ordeal" (1:22)
 "Adieu Gage" (1:22)
 "Rachel Against Time" (0:49)
 "The Return Game" (Jud and Gage) (3:42)
 "Moving Day Waltz" (0:30)
 "The Warning Tour" (1:41)
 "Death Do Us Part" (Rachel Hugs Louis) (0:53)
 "Nine Lives Minus Seven" (0:14)
 "Up in Flames" (Flashback) (1:38)
 "Bitter Loss" (Flashback) (1:51)
 "Rachel's Dirty Secret" (0:22)
 "Return Game Attack" (1:54)
 "Rachel's Blow Out" (0:20)
 "I Brought You Something Mommie" (0:34)
 "The Return Game II" (Louis and Gage) (2:52)
 "Gentle Exhuming" (1:03)
 "To the Micmac Grounds" (2:45)
 "Chorale" (0:29)
 "Kite and Truck" (1:22)
 "Immolation" (1:37)

Personnel
Music composed by Elliot Goldenthal
Album produced by Elliot Goldenthal
Orchestrated by Elliot Goldenthal and Robert Elhai
Conducted by Steven Mercurio
Performed by the Orchestra of St. Luke's
Vocals performed by the Zarathustra Boys Chorus
Recorded by Phil Bulla, Mixed by Joel Iwataki
Synthesizer programming/supervision by Mathias Gohl

References

External links
 
 Goldenthal's webpage entry
 Varèse Sarabande page for the score

1989 soundtrack albums
Varèse Sarabande soundtracks
Elliot Goldenthal soundtracks
Pet Sematary
Horror film soundtracks
Classical music soundtracks
Electronic soundtracks